Harold Newton (September 14, 1933 – January 2, 2014) was a Canadian football player who played for the Hamilton Tiger-Cats, Calgary Stampeders and Toronto Argonauts. He won the Grey Cup with Hamilton in 1957. He died at the age of 80 in 2014.

References

1933 births
Hamilton Tiger-Cats players
Calgary Stampeders players
Toronto Argonauts players
2014 deaths